Aerial are a power-pop band who formed in the late 1990s in  Aberdeen, Scotland.

History
Aerial are a power-pop band formed in Aberdeen, Scotland in the late 1990s. In 1999, the band signed to London-label Fantastic Plastic Records  and recorded and released two EPs, Signal  and Star of the Show  in 2000.

Aerial played live across the UK in 2000 and 2001, making appearances at T in the Park, Glasgow’s Gig on the Green as part of a UK-tour with label-mates Astrid and Angelica. Aerial’s debut album, Back Within Reach, was recorded by Duncan Cameron at Riverside Studios in Glasgow and released by Japanese label Syft Records in 2001.

Aerial announced via their Twitter page that they had returned to the studio to record a new album, to be released in 2014. The resulting album, Why Don't They Teach Heartbreak At School?, was recorded by Ben Phillips at Lightship95 in London and released in September 2014 by Powerpop Academy / Thistime Records in Japan and Kool Kat Records in the US. The album was featured as BBC Radio Scotland's 'Record of Note' on The Roddy Hart Show on 12 September 2014

Discography

Albums
 Back Within Reach (SYFT-020LP, 2001)
 Why Don't They Teach Heartbreak At School? (XQER-1078, 2014)

EPs and Singles

 Signal EP (FPS019 / SYFT009, 2000)
 Star of the Show EP (FPS022 / SYFT013, 2000)

References

External links 
Facebook Page
Twitter Page
Back Within Reach review
Official Website

Scottish pop music groups
Scottish power pop groups